Look Who's Talking Too is a 1990 American romantic comedy film and a sequel to director Amy Heckerling's 1989 comedy Look Who's Talking. The film stars the original cast members John Travolta and Kirstie Alley as James and Mollie Ubriacco, the parents of Mikey (voiced by Bruce Willis), a toddler coping with the newest addition to the family, baby Julie (voiced by Roseanne Barr).

In addition to this, he is having trouble using a potty, and the unorthodox advice he gets from his playmate, Eddie (voiced by Damon Wayans), doesn't make his problem any better.

Plot
The movie picks up with the now married Mollie and James preparing for the birth of a new baby girl, while teaching Mikey how to use the potty. Meanwhile, James is working diligently to bring in more income for the family. 

Mikey looks forward to meeting his sibling as well as being a responsible big brother. When the baby is about to be born, her umbilical cord gets caught around her neck, putting her in distress. Given the name "Julie", she is born through a c-section and is taken to the nursery area for observation.

When Julie meets Mikey, she is unimpressed. He quickly begins to resent his sister when his dreams of being a responsible big brother don't match the reality. Meanwhile, Mollie's slacker younger brother, Stuart comes to stay, to whom James takes an immediate dislike. 

This, combined with James being pressured into taking a demanding piloting job arranged by Mollie's parents and his belief that Mollie is too protective of Mikey, causes several arguments between the pair which eventually lead to James leaving. Mikey is upset about this and, believing he has left because of Julie, tears up one of his sister's stuffed animals. 

James occasionally hangs out with his kids (including scamming their way into a movie theater) and has fun with them. Following a burglary, Mollie's best friend Rona moves in with her and she soon starts dating Stuart.

Following the 'death' of her beloved stuffed penguin (whom she named Herbie), Julie decides to learn to walk and leave. Later, she manages to walk to the sofa without 
support. Mollie sees this and is initially excited but then saddened that James isn't there to share the moment. 

As he watches Julie sleep one night, Mikey realizes how badly he's treated her and resolves to change his ways. Mollie decides to win James back and dresses sexy for him, but he isn't interested. As the two bicker, Mikey uses the toilet for the first time and calls his parents, who are immensely proud of him and share a happy moment.

One night as James prepares to fly, Mollie watches the news and learns that storms are all around the area. She goes to get James before he takes off, leaving Stuart with Mikey and Julie. She catches him and tries to persuade him not to take off, just as the control tower cancels the flight. They then make up. 

Meanwhile, a burglar (presumably the same one who also robbed Rona) breaks in and runs when Stuart comes in with his unloaded gun. Stuart pursues him having forgotten about the kids and completely oblivious to the fact that he left paper on a hot stove which quickly causes a fire to start. Mikey doesn't panic and takes charge, pushing Julie out of the apartment to safety. 

Stuart and the burglar run into James who subdues the thief. Mollie and James soon find out the kids were left alone and spot the fire in the apartment, only for Mikey and Julie to emerge from the elevator as the two prepare to head in to save them. James then puts out the fire before it can cause too much damage.

The next day, James, Mollie, Stuart, Rona and Mollie's parents attend a barbecue. There, Julie asks Mikey why he saved her when they're always fighting. Mikey tells her that for as much as they get on each other's nerves, they're the kids and should stick together since the grown ups never make any sense to them. The two then walk off hand in hand.

Cast
 John Travolta as James Ubriacco/Voice of James' sperm cells (uncredited)
 Kirstie Alley as Mollie Ubriacco/Voice of Mollie's egg (uncredited)
 Lorne Sussman as Mikey Ubriacco
 Megan Milner as Julie Ubriacco (age 1 year)
Georgia Keithley as Julie (age 4 months)
Nikki Graham as Julie (fetus–newborn) 
 Danny Pringle as Eddie
 Elias Koteas as Stuart Jensen
 Twink Caplan as Rona
 Olympia Dukakis as Rosie Jensen
 Lesley Ewen as Debbie
 Gilbert Gottfried as Joey, the baby gym instructor
 Don S. Davis as Dr. Fleischer

Voices
 Bruce Willis as Mikey Ubriacco
 Roseanne Barr as Julie Ubriacco
 Damon Wayans as Eddie
 Mel Brooks as Mr. Toilet Man

Production
The famous TriStar Pictures theme music, composed by Dave Grusin, was played during the scene when Julie practices walking. A variation exists at the beginning of the logo when Bruce Willis (voice of Mikey) was doing a Mister Ed imitation.

Casting
The bum teaser at the end of the first film portrayed an uncredited Joan Rivers, providing the voice of Julie. Due to scheduling conflicts, she declined the role.

Also in the early trailer, Richard Pryor was originally going to be the voice of Eddie.

Also appearing are Olympia Dukakis, Elias Koteas, and Gilbert Gottfried. Further vocal talents include Damon Wayans in a supporting role as the voice of Eddie. Mel Brooks makes a cameo appearance as the voice of Mr. Toilet Man. The film was followed by another sequel, Look Who's Talking Now, in 1993.

Alternative versions
When the film aired on ABC Family, many of its deleted scenes such as Mollie threatening Mikey with corporal punishment if he takes Julie away again (Kirstie Alley reportedly hated saying that as she was an advocate against corporal punishment) were shown. One notable addition is a running gag where Mollie chats with her friends and folks and it ignites a daydream of James cheating on her. There is even one sequence where she imagines him as John Lennon and herself as Yoko Ono parodying their activism.

In one version, James and Stuart have a conversation after he arrives in the apartment.

Reception
Unlike its predecessor, it received mostly negative reviews. Rotten Tomatoes gives it a score of 13% based on 16 reviews, with an average rating of 3.5/10. Audiences polled by CinemaScore gave the film an average grade of "B" on an A+ to F scale. The film was released in the United Kingdom on March 22, 1991, and reached number 2 in the country's box office that weekend.
 
It grossed $47,789,074 at the box office in the United States and Canada,  and $73.1 million internationally, for a worldwide total of $120.9 million.

It was also nominated for two Razzie Awards, including Worst Supporting Actor for Gilbert Gottfried and Worst Supporting Actress for Roseanne Barr, and a Stinkers Bad Movie Award for Worst Picture.

References

External links

 
 
 
 

1990 films
1990 romantic comedy films
1990s pregnancy films
American pregnancy films
American romantic comedy films
American sequel films
Films about babies
Films directed by Amy Heckerling
Films scored by David Kitay
Films set in New York City
Films shot in New York City
Films shot in Vancouver
Films with screenplays by Amy Heckerling
Films with screenplays by Neal Israel
TriStar Pictures films
1990s English-language films
Films about children
1990s American films